"The Voice" is Ultravox's second single from the Rage in Eden album, recorded in Conny Plank's Studio in Cologne, Germany and released on 29 October 1981. It peaked at #16 in the UK singles chart, #27 in the Irish Singles Chart and #29 in the New Zealand Singles Chart.

Track listings

7" vinyl

12" vinyl

Videos

There were two different videos made for the single.  One has the band miming a performance in a slanted room; the band members appear to be standing at an unnatural angle.   The other video is more elaborate, contains war imagery, single-word slogans in knock-out text, features Billy Currie appearing as a radio announcer, and Midge Ure as a soldier.

Live Performances
Live versions of The Voice appear on the live albums Monument and Return to Eden.

References

Ultravox songs
1981 singles
Songs written by Midge Ure
Songs written by Chris Cross
Songs written by Billy Currie
Songs written by Warren Cann
Music videos directed by Russell Mulcahy
1981 songs
Chrysalis Records singles